Gedik can refer to:

 Gədik, Azerbaijan
 Gedik, Bayramiç, Turkey